Karl Emil Salomonsson (born 28 April 1989) is a Swedish professional footballer who plays for Allsvenskan club IFK Göteborg as a right back.

Career

Early career

Starting his career in Ekets GoIF, he then moved to Ängelholms FF in 2004. During the 2006 season in Division 1 he gained the interest from three clubs in Allsvenskan, IFK Göteborg, Helsingborgs IF and Halmstads BK, he went on trial with all three and eventually signed for Halmstads BK, however he was directly loaned back to Ängelholms FF where he would stay until 1 July, he could then return to Halmstads BK, but Halmstad let him stay for the rest of the season. The main part of the 2009 season he was used as a right wing defender, however in the game against Kalmar FF on 9 August he played as forward.

IFK Göteborg
On 30 August 2011, it was confirmed that Salomonsson had signed for Allsvenskan rivals IFK Göteborg. During his first time in IFK Göteborg, he played a small role and acted as back-up for Adam Johansson. However, when Johansson left the club, he became the first-choice right back and in the 2012 season he played 27 matches when IFK finished in 7th place. Before the start of the 2013, he wasn't the first-choice anymore with the comeback of Adam Johansson, the arrival of Ludwig Augustinsson and Mikael Dyrestam already being in the squad. However, because of injuries, he played 28 matches that season, most of them as defender, but some as a right winger. In the 2014 season, he once again started the season as the second-choice, but in the summer the reclaimed his place in the starting-eleven and he was a big contributor to IFK once again qualified for UEFA Europa League qualification. On 30 September 2014, he signed a new contract, keeping him at the club until the end of the 2018 season.

Sanfrecce Hiroshima
He scored his first goal for Sanfrecce Hiroshima on his J1 League debut against Shimizu S-Pulse on 23 February 2019.

Avispa Fukuoka
On 7 January 2020, he was loaned from Sanfrecce Hiroshima to Avispa Fukuoka in the J2 League. From the start of the season, he was a regular in the team and played in 39 of the 42 league games. He quickly became one of the team's most popular players thanks to his athleticism and precision, while his personality earned him the respect of the fans. His performances helped Avispa Fukuoka to finish second in the league and gain promotion to J1 League. On 6 January 2021, he announced the end of his loan and his transfer to Fukuoka. In the 2021 season, he scored three goals in 32 league games and two goals in the J.League Cup. His performances helped Avispa Fukuoka to a record 8th place finish in J1 League.

Return to IFK Göteborg 
On 10 December 2021, it was announced that Salomonsson would return to IFK Göteborg on a free transfer. He signed a three-year contract.

Career statistics

Club

International

Appearances and goals by national team and year

International goals
Scores and results list Sweden's goal tally first.

Honours
;IFK Göteborg
Svenska Cupen: 2012–13, 2014–15
Individual
Archangel of the Year (IFK Göteborg player of the year): 2014

References

External links
 
 
 Profile at IFK Göteborg

1989 births
Living people
Swedish footballers
Sweden youth international footballers
Sweden under-21 international footballers
Sweden international footballers
Swedish expatriate footballers
Association football midfielders
Allsvenskan players
Superettan players
J1 League players
Ängelholms FF players
Halmstads BK players
IFK Göteborg players
Sanfrecce Hiroshima players
Expatriate footballers in Japan